Rohini Khadilkar (born 1 April 1963 in Mumbai) is a chess player holding the title of Woman International Master (WIM). She has won the Indian women's championship five times and the Asian women's championship twice.
She was the first female chess player to receive the Arjuna Award in 1980. 

She is the youngest of the three Khadilkar sisters - named Vasanti, Jayashri, and Rohini - all of whom excelled at chess. Their father, Nilkanth Khadilkar (1934-2019), was a famous journalist in Marathi language based near Mumbai, and all three sisters were helping run the newspaper 'Nava Kal' founded by their father at the time of his death. The family's association with literature goes all the way back to Marathi playwright Krishnaji Prabhakar Khadilkar (1872-1948), who was the great-grandfather to the sisters.

Chess career

Women's competitions
Khadilkar became national women's chess champion in 1976 at the age of 13 and was the first to win that championship in three consecutive years. She has held the title on five occasions:
 November 1976, at Kottayam, Kerala
 December 1977, at Hyderabad
 March 1979, at Madras
 February 1981, at New Delhi
 December 1983, at New Delhi.

In 1981, Khadilkar also became the Asian women's chess champion when the competition was held at Hyderabad. She was unbeaten in that competition and scored 11.5 out of a possible 12 points. In the same year, she became a Woman International Master and in November 1983, she again won the Asian women's title when the competition was held at Kuala Lumpur, Malaysia.

Men's competitions
Khadilkar became the first female to compete in the Indian Men's Championship when she participated in 1976. Her involvement in a male competition caused a furore that necessitated a successful appeal to the High Court and caused the World Chess Federation president, Max Euwe, to rule that women cannot be barred from national and international championships. She beat three state champions - Gaurang Mehta of Gujarat, Abdul Jabbar of Maharashtra and A. K. Ghosh of West Bengal - in the competition.

Other competitions

Khadilkar participated in the Chess Olympiad in Buenos Aires (1978), Valletta (1980), Lucerne (1982), Thessaloniki (1984), and Dubai (1986).

Khadilkar won the Zonal Championships twice, in Dubai and Malaysia,  and became the World No.8 player. She was also the first Asian player to beat a chess computer, in London in 1989.

On one occasion, she played 113 opponents simultaneously, winning 111 of the games and drawing two.

Chess Ambassador

Rohini has travelled abroad to represent India on 56 occasions, visiting numerous countries. On each occasion, she was sponsored by the Government of India as a Chess Ambassador. Her visits included trips to the then-Communist countries of Poland, USSR and Yugoslavia, which were encouraged by Indira Gandhi, the prime minister at that time.

Newspaper career
In 1993, Rohini retired from chess and enrolled as a student at the Printing Technology Institute. She came first in her cohort, earning a Gold Medal, and was given Printing Diploma by Agfa-Gevaert.

Rohini became the first female editor of an evening newspaper in Maharashtra. She is the assistant editor of Navakal and has been editor of Sandhyakal since 16 December 1998.

Recognition

In 1977, Rohini won the Chhatrapati Award for outstanding performance in chess. Subsequently, she has been awarded India's highest honour in sports, the Arjuna award. She has also been declared Maharashtra Kanya for her chess exploits.

References

External links

Rohini Khadilkar chess games at 365Chess.com

1963 births
Living people
Indian female chess players
Chess Woman International Masters
Sportswomen from Maharashtra
Recipients of the Arjuna Award
Sportspeople from Mumbai
20th-century Indian women
20th-century Indian people
Khadilkar sisters